Sabahudin "Saša" Vugdalić (born 16 January 1953) is a Bosnian sports journalist and former football goalkeeper who played for clubs in the former Yugoslavia and Turkey.

Club career
Born in Srebrenica, Vugdalić started playing professional football for local side FK Famos Hrasnica. He would play in the Yugoslav Second League for FK Bor and NK Rudar Velenje, before joining Yugoslav First League side NK Olimpija Ljubljana

In 1981, Vugdalić moved to Turkey, joining Süper Lig side Gaziantepspor. He made 20 league appearances in one season with the club.

He will then return to Yugoslavia and finish his career by playing in Second League with FK Napredak Kruševac in 1983–84.

After retiring from playing, Vugdalić became a sports journalist, working for Sarajevo-based Televizija OBN.

Personal life
Vugdalić earned fame for executing a series of dangerous rescues. At age 17, he jumped off a bridge over the Drina to save a drowning 11-year-old. Two years later, he rescued a mother and daughter from a car that had crashed into a ravine in Ivan planina while he was on leave from military duty. Four years later, he saved a mother and her two children who were trapped in a burning vehicle while he was in Zurich.

Vugdalić is the father of former Slovenia international footballer, Muamer Vugdalić.

References

External links
 EX YU Fudbalska Statistika po godinama
 

1953 births
Living people
People from Srebrenica
Association football goalkeepers
Bosnia and Herzegovina footballers
Yugoslav footballers
FK Famos Hrasnica players
NK Iskra Bugojno players
FK Bor players
HNK Rijeka players
NK Rudar Velenje players
NK Olimpija Ljubljana (1945–2005) players
Gaziantepspor footballers
FK Napredak Kruševac players
Yugoslav First League players
Süper Lig players
Yugoslav Second League players
Yugoslav expatriate footballers
Expatriate footballers in Turkey
Yugoslav expatriate sportspeople in Turkey
Bosniaks of Bosnia and Herzegovina